Montalban Hotel is a part of the EastWest Records family of labels.

Current Bands 
Pistolita

See also 
 List of record labels

External links
Official Site

American record labels